Vinutha Lal (born Aswathy Lal) is an Indian actress and model known for her works in Malayalam cinema. In 2014 she starred in Parankimala a remake of the 1981 Malayalam film of the same name, Lal has appeared in the mundu outfit donning the role of a woman named Thanka.

Filmography

References

Living people
Indian film actresses
Actresses in Malayalam cinema
Actresses in Kannada cinema
Actresses in Telugu cinema
21st-century Indian actresses
1990 births